Velvet is a particular kind of woven tufted fabric.

Velvet may also refer to:

Arts, entertainment, and media

Fictional characters
Velvet, one of the five main characters of Odin Sphere
Velvet Crowe, one of the main protagonists of Tales of Berseria
Velvet Hoofstrong, one of the main characters in the video game Them's Fightin' Herds.
 Velvet, a character in the animated web series Hazbin Hotel

Literature
Velvet (magazine), a pornographic magazine
Velvet (novel), a 2016 novel by Palestinian author Huzama Habayeb
Velvet, a comic book series by Ed Brubaker and Steve Epting

Music

Groups and labels
 The Velvet Underground, a former American rock band formed in 1964 in New York City 
 The Velvets (1959–1962), a doo-wop group
 Velvet Revolver (2002–2008), an American hard rock supergroup

Albums
Velvet (Wink album), 1990 album by Japanese band Wink
Velvet (EP), a 1992 cassette EP by the Toadies
Velvet (Stoney LaRue album), 2011 album by Stoney LaRue
Velvet (Adam Lambert album), 2020 album by Adam Lambert
The Velvet, a 2016 EP by Red Velvet

Songs
"Velvet" (Savoy song), a song by Savoy from the 1996 album, Mary Is Coming
"Velvet", a song by Miss Kittin from the 2002 album On the Road
"Velvet", a song by Fergie from the 2006 album The Dutchess
"Velvet" (The Big Pink song), a song by The Big Pink from the 2009 album A Brief History of Love
"Velvet" (Chris Jamison song), a 2014 song by Chris Jamison

Television
Velvet (TV channel), a women-targeted general entertainment channel
Velvet (TV series), a Spanish TV series

Other uses in arts, entertainment, and media
Velvet (film), a 1984 American TV film
Velvet (musical), an Australian musical partly based on New York's Studio 54
Velvet (Sirius XM), a contemporary pop music channel on the Sirius XM subscription service 
 Velvet Film, a Germany-based film production company founded by Haitian filmmaker Raoul Peck in 1986 
Velvet painting, a type of painting distinguished by the use of velvet (usually black velvet) as the support, in place of canvas, paper, or similar materials

Biology
Velvet (fish disease), a common disease of tropical aquarium fish
Velvet (plant), several plants in the genus Verbascum, especially V. thapsus
Velvet antler, the soft skin that covers a deer's antlers as they develop

Other uses
Velvet (bus company) based in Eastleigh, near Southampton, in England
Velvet (dog), a dog who saved three mountain climbers on Mount Hood, Oregon
Velvet (music venue), an alternative music club in Rimini, Italy
Velvet (singer) (born 1975), Swedish singer
Velvet, Washington, a community in the United States
Velvet assembler, a set of algorithms for genomic sequence assembly
Velvet Divorce, the dissolution of Czechoslovakia in 1993
Velvet Revolution, the nonviolent overthrow of the communist government in Czechoslovakia in 1989
Velvet Ice Cream Company, an ice cream company in Ohio

See also 
 Velveeta
 Velveting, a Chinese cooking technique